The white-fronted black chat (Oenanthe albifrons) is a species of passerine bird in the family Muscicapidae.
It is found in Benin, Burkina Faso, Cameroon, Central African Republic, Chad, Democratic Republic of the Congo, Ivory Coast, Eritrea, Ethiopia, Gambia, Ghana, Guinea, Guinea-Bissau, Mali, Mauritania, Niger, Nigeria, Senegal, Sierra Leone, South Sudan, Togo, and Uganda.
Its natural habitats are moist savanna and subtropical or tropical dry shrubland.

The white-fronted black chat was formerly included in the genus Myrmecocichla.  Molecular phylogenetic studies published in 2010 and 2012 found that the species was phylogenetically nested within the genus Oenanthe. As part of a reorganization of the chat species to create monophyletic genera, the white-fronted black chat was moved to the genus Oenanthe.

References

white-fronted black chat
Birds of Sub-Saharan Africa
Birds of West Africa
white-fronted black chat
Taxonomy articles created by Polbot